William Wilson DL (28 June 1913 – 18 August 2010), was a British Labour Party politician. He was a Member of Parliament (MP) for constituencies in Coventry from 1964 to 1983.

Wilson was educated at Coventry Technical College and Birmingham University.  He served in the British Army during World War II in North Africa, Italy and Greece, rising to the rank of sergeant. After the war he qualified as a solicitor and made several unsuccessful attempts to win the Warwick and Leamington constituency in 1951, 1955, 1957 and 1959, before being successful in 1964 in Coventry South, which he represented (later as Coventry South East) until retiring from Parliament in 1983. He also was a Warwickshire County Councillor from 1958, being leader of the Labour Group in the 1960s and from 1972 to 1993.

Wilson was responsible for piloting the Divorce Reform Act 1969 through Parliament which changed the basis for divorce procedures from the old concept of matrimonial offences to that of the irretrievable breakdown of marriage.

References

Sources
 "William Wilson" (obituary), The Times online, 20 September 2010.
 Obituary in Telegraph, 28 September 2010

External links 
 
 Catalogue of Wilson's papers, held at the Modern Records Centre, University of Warwick

1913 births
2010 deaths
Alumni of the University of Birmingham
Labour Party (UK) MPs for English constituencies
UK MPs 1964–1966
UK MPs 1966–1970
UK MPs 1970–1974
UK MPs 1974
UK MPs 1974–1979
UK MPs 1979–1983
Deputy Lieutenants of Warwickshire
British Army personnel of World War II
Members of Warwickshire County Council
British Army soldiers
English solicitors
20th-century English lawyers